Cesar Fernando Silva dos Santos (born 29 November 1989), commonly known as Cesinha, is a Brazilian professional footballer who plays for Daegu FC as a forward.

Career

Early years in Brazil
Born in São José do Rio Preto, Brazil, Cesinha graduated with Corinthians youth system, but made his senior debuts while on loan at Osvaldo Cruz. After appearing for União Barbarense and Pão de Açúcar, he returned to the former on 7 December 2011. On 16 May 2012 Cesinha signed for Bragantino. After appearing sparingly, he returned to Barbarense in January of the following year, in a six-month loan deal. Cesinha returned to Braga in June 2013, appearing regularly afterwards. On 3 October of the following year he was loaned to Atlético Mineiro, until May 2015. Cesinha made his Série A debut on 9 October, replacing Luan in a 0–0 away draw against Fluminense. On 6 May 2015 he moved to fellow league team Ponte Preta, until December.

South Korea
In 2016, Cesinha joined South Korean club Daegu FC on loan. Scoring 11 goals, he helped secure the club's promotion that year from K League 2 to the top tier of football in South Korea, K League 1. His loan was made permanent the following year. By June 2020, he had lived in South Korea for five years, one of the criteria to become a citizen of the country. Media reported that Cesinha was keen to become a South Korean citizen and represent the country in international football.

Career statistics

Club

Honours
Atlético Mineiro
Campeonato Mineiro: 2015
Copa do Brasil: 2014

Daegu FC
Korean FA Cup: 2018

Individual
K League 1 Best XI: 2019, 2020, 2021, 2022
K League 2 Best XI: 2016
K League 1 Top assist provider: 2018
Korean FA Cup Most Valuable Player: 2018
Korean FA Cup Top scorer: 2018

References

External links
Atlético Mineiro official profile 

1989 births
Living people
Footballers from São Paulo (state)
Brazilian footballers
Association football forwards
Campeonato Brasileiro Série A players
Campeonato Brasileiro Série B players
União Agrícola Barbarense Futebol Clube players
Clube Atlético Bragantino players
Clube Atlético Mineiro players
Associação Atlética Ponte Preta players
América Futebol Clube (MG) players
Daegu FC players
K League 2 players
K League 1 players
Expatriate footballers in South Korea